Copelatus schereri is a species of diving beetle. It is part of the subfamily Copelatinae in the family Dytiscidae. It was described by Wewalka in 1981.

References

schereri
Beetles described in 1981